The Center for Information, Technology, and Development (CITAD) is a Nigeria non-governmental  organisation that was established to promote democracy and active citizenship through information and communication technology in addendum with civic empowerment programs. It has its headquarter in Kano and branches in Abuja, Jama'are, Itas, Dutse (Jigawa State), Azare, Gombe and Yobe States.

History 
CITAD came into existence in 1997 as a Computer Literacy Project. In 2000, the capacity was increased and it currently covers 12 different units which are: are;

 Digital Creativity and Innovation for Young Women (DICI-YOW)
 Gender Violence and Human Rights
 Governance and elections 
 Capacity Building 
 Digital Inclusion
 ICTs in Education
 
 ICTs in Peace Building
 JOPIS: Job Placement Information Services Job Placement Information Services (JOPIS) 
 Youth Entrepreneurship
 Research and Knowledge Production (dialogues, series,)
 Accountability and Anti-corruption

Governance 
The governing board consists of the chairman, the executive directors, the treasurer and four members.

The Chairman 
The Chairman is Prof. Amina Kaidal from the University of Maiduguri.

Executive director 
The executive director of the organisation is Engineer Yunusa Ya'u.

Treasurer 
The treasurer for the organisation is Ahmad A. Yakasai

Vision 
The vision of the organisation is to build a knowledge based democratic and self reliant society.

Mission 
CITAD's mission is to build citizens for a just and knowledge-based society that is hanged on sustainable and balanced development using Information Communication Technology, Capacity Development Programmes, Advocacy, Research and Partnership.

References 

Non-governmental organizations
Organizations based in Kano
1997 establishments in Nigeria
Organizations established in 1987